The 32nd Aviation Division (Serbo-Croatian: 32. vazduhoplovna divizija/ 32. ваздухопловна дивизија) was a Yugoslavian military air unit originally established in 1945 as the 4th Aviation Bomber Division (Serbo-Croatian: 4. vazduhoplovna bombarderska divizija / 4. ваздухопловна бомбардерска дивизија).

History

4th Aviation Bomber Division
The 4th Aviation Bomber Division was established by order from August 3, 1945, with headquarters at Sombor. The division was direct under the Command of Yugoslav Air Force. It consisted from 41st and 42nd Bomber Aviation Regiment.

In 1947 third regiment attached to this division, 43rd Bomber Aviation Regiment was established.

By the 1948 year this division was renamed like all other units of Yugoslav Army, so it has become 32nd Aviation Bomber Division (Serbo-Croatian: 32. vazduhoplovna bombarderska divizija/ 32. ваздухопловна бомбардерска дивизија).

The commanders of division in this period were Božo Lazarević and Sava Poljanec. Commissars were Radoje Ljubičić, Drago Vuković and Ljubiša Čerguz.

32nd Aviation Division

The 32nd Aviation Bomber Division was formed by renaming of 4th Aviation Bomber Division in 1948. It suffered a changes in the organization. Division has moved from Sombor same year to Boronogaj and finally to Pleso in 1951 where it has stayed until it was disbanded.

In 1950 division was attached to 3rd Aviation Corps. It has relocated its headquarters from Zagreb to Cerklje. By 1957 it was renamed as the Aviation Fighter Division due to the replace of bomber aircraft with domestic-made fighters.

It was disbanded by the order from June 27, 1959, per the "Drvar" reorganization plan. It was transformed into 5th Air Command.

The commanders of division in this period were  August Canjko, Radoslav Jović, Milan Tojagić and Stanislav Perhavec. Commissars were Ljubiša Čerguz, Ivan Dolničar and Novak Matijašević until 1953.

Assignments
Command of Yugoslav Air Force (1945–1953)
3rd Aviation Corps (1949–1959)

Previous designations
4th Aviation Bomber Division (1945–1948)
32nd Aviation Bomber Division (1948–1957)
32nd Aviation Fighter Division (1957–1959)

Organization

1945-1948
4th Aviation Bomber Division
41st Bomber Aviation Regiment
42nd Bomber Aviation Regiment
43rd Bomber Aviation Regiment

1948-1959
 32nd Aviation Bomber Division /Fighter Division
Training Squadron of 32nd Aviation Division (1953–1959)
88th Bomber Aviation Regiment
109th Bomber Aviation Regiment
184th Reconnaissance Aviation Regiment (1948–1953)
40th Fighter Aviation Regiment (1955–1959)
151st Air Base (1953–1959)

Headquarters
Sombor (1945–1948)
Borongaj (1948–1951)
Pleso (1951–1959)

Commanding officers
Major General Božo Lazarević	
Colonel Sava Poljanec
Lieutenant-Colonel August Canjko 
Major General Radoslav Jović
Colonel Milan Tojagić
Colonel Stanislav Perhavec

Political commissars
Colonel Radoje Ljubičić
Colonel Drago Vuković
Colonel Ljubiša Čerguz
Colonel Ivan Dolničar
Colonel Novak Matijašević

References 
Notes and citations

Bibliography
 

Divisions of Yugoslav Air Force
Military units and formations established in 1945
Military units and formations disestablished in 1959